The Istanbul Open (also known as the TEB BNP Paribas Istanbul Open for sponsorship purposes) was a men's tennis event on the ATP Tour held in the Turkish city of Istanbul. From 2015 to 2018, it was part of the ATP 250 Series. The tournament was played on outdoor clay courts. This was the first Turkish ATP World Tour event.

The inaugural tournament was held from 27 April to 3 May 2015 at the "Koza World of Sports" facility, which is promoted as the largest tennis academy in the world. The center court featured a retractable roof and provided seating for 7,500 people. Two other clay show courts raised available seating to 9,500. The tournament was discontinued in 2018.

Finals

Singles

Doubles

See also
 İstanbul Cup – women's tournament

References

External links
 Official tournament website
 Association of Tennis Professionals (ATP) tournament profile

 
Defunct tennis tournaments in Europe
Clay court tennis tournaments
Tennis tournaments in Turkey
ATP Tour 250
Sport in Istanbul
2015 establishments in Turkey
2018 disestablishments in Turkey
Recurring sporting events established in 2015
Recurring sporting events disestablished in 2018